The Kukotsky Enigma is a novel by acclaimed Russian novelist and public intellectual Lyudmila Ulitskaya. The Kukotsky Enigma won the 2001 Russian Booker Prize. With five, Ulitskaya holds the record for the most nominations for that prestigious award. In 2005, a television series based on the novel by director Yuri Grymov was aired in Russia. Critics suggest that the book's focus on abortion (from 1936 to 1955 it was allowed in USSR only for medical reasons) offers a new reading of Stalinism through the lens of family life and the female body.

Plot summary
The novel follows the life of the family of gynecologist Pavel Alekseevich Kukotsky. The story follows him from Stalin’s 1936 ban on abortions through the mid-1960s.

The novel consists of four parts. The first describes the life of the Kukotsky family members before the 1960s: his wife Yelena, their adopted daughter Tanya, a classmate Toma, and a former nun working as a housekeeper in Yelena’s home. The second part is a dream Yelena experiences while hovering between life and death. The third part covers the life of the family after 1960 and up to Tanya's death. The fourth part forms a brief epilogue.

Editions
2001, Russian Federation, Izdatelstvo Ast, Pub date 2001
The Kukotsky Enigma translated by Diane Nemec Ignashev. Northwestern University Press, 15 August 2016;

References

2001 novels
21st-century Russian novels
Family saga novels